The 1968 season of the Venezuelan Primera División, the top category of Venezuelan football, was played by 6 teams. The national champions were Unión Deportiva Canarias.

Results

First stage

Final Stage

External links
Venezuela 1968 season at RSSSF

Ven
Venezuelan Primera División seasons
1968 in Venezuelan sport